Richard Astre (born August 28, 1948, in Toulouse, France) is a retired French international rugby union player.

Astre played as a Scrum-half for AS Béziers which he won six Top 14. In 1971 he was the youngest captain of French rugby championship. He earned his first national cap on 12 November 1971 against the Romania in Béziers. He captained France national rugby union team six times. But the coach Jean Desclaux preferred Jacques Fouroux.

Honours 
 Selected to represent France, 1971–1974
 French rugby champion, 1971, 1972, 1974, 1975, 1977, 1978 with AS Béziers
 Challenge Yves du Manoir 1972, 1975 and 1977 with AS Béziers
 French championship finalist 1976 with AS Béziers

External links
Statistiques scrum.com

1948 births
French rugby union players
Living people
France international rugby union players
Rugby union scrum-halves
Rugby union players from Toulouse
AS Béziers Hérault players